The Autovía V-31, commonly called Pista de Silla, is an autovía in Valencia, Spain. It is 13 km (8 miles) long and runs from the junction of the Autopista AP-7 and the Autovía A-7 near the small town of Silla to the Autovía V-30 on the southern outskirts of the city centre. Built as an upgrade of the N-332 road, which used to run through small towns in the Southern metropolitan area, it is frequently used by commuters and drivers travelling between Valencia and Alicante or Albacete.

References 

Autopistas and autovías in Spain
Transport in the Valencian Community